John McElligott may refer to:

John J. McElligott (1882–1946), American fire commissioner
John L. McElligott (born 1958), Irish Gaelic footballer